The Business & Career Library was a branch of the Brooklyn Public Library (BPL), located at 280 Cadman Plaza West in Brooklyn Heights, next to Downtown Brooklyn in New York City. Its history precedes that of the BPL itself. In 1852, prominent citizens established the Brooklyn Athenaeum and Reading Room for the instruction of young men.  In 1857, a group of young men established the Brooklyn Mercantile Library Association of the City of Brooklyn, which shared a building with the Athenaeum.  The Mercantile Library attempted to be more practical, placing less emphasis on Literature and philosophy.  The librarian in charge was Stephen Buttrick Noyes. In 1866, he went to work at the Library of Congress.

In 1869, the Mercantile Library and the Athenaeum consolidated their holdings and moved to a new building, the Montague Street Branch Library. Also in 1869, Noyes returned, and one of his labors on his return was the preparation of a catalog, which was issued in 1881. In 1878, the Mercantile Library was renamed the Brooklyn Library.  By 1943, the Business Reference Department was known as the Business Library.  The library outgrew its space, and in 1957, a new building to house both the Business Library and the Brooklyn Heights neighborhood branch was approved by city government.  On June 1, 1962, the new $2.5 million library building opened its doors to the public at its current location.  In 1993, a two-year renovation and expansion was completed; the renovated building housed both the Brooklyn Heights branch and Business & Career Library.

In 2013, BPL announced its intent to sell 280 Cadman Plaza West, and as part of this announcement, the Business and Career Library's functions were relocated to BPL's Central Branch. BPL then sold the branch to developer Hudson Companies. Hudson Companies then demolished the structure and replaced it with a 34-story condominium, which would contain a smaller Brooklyn Heights branch library at its base when it is completed in 2020. In the interim, the BPL opened a temporary branch at 109 Remsen Street.

References 

Libraries in Brooklyn
Brooklyn Heights
Brooklyn Public Library